The following is a list of prominent people who were born in Worcester, Massachusetts, lived in Worcester, or for whom Worcester is a significant part of their identity.

Academics and inventors

 Richard T. Antoun, Professor Emeritus of Anthropology at Binghamton University
 Harvey Ball, inventor of the smiley face
Alan T. Busby, educator and first African American alumnus of the University of Connecticut
 Harold W. Chase, educator and United States military officer
 Robert Goddard, father of modern rocketry
 G. Stanley Hall, first president of Clark University
John Kneller, English-American professor and fifth President of Brooklyn College
David Green, president of Colby College
Leonard Morse, university professor of clinical medicine
Lawrence Park, art historian, architect, and genealogist
 Francis E. Reed, inventor and industrialist who founded F.E. Reed & Co.
 Daniel B. Wesson, gunsmith, co-founder of Smith & Wesson

Actors and artists

 John Wolcott Adams (1874–1925), artist
 Edith Ella Baldwin (1846–1920), artist
 H. Jon Benjamin, actor best known as the voices of Sterling Archer on Archer, Bob Belcher on Bob's Burgers, and Can of Vegetables in the Wet Hot American Summer franchise
 Christopher Boffoli, photographer
 Elbridge Boyden, architect of Mechanics Hall
 Zara Cully, actress best known for The Jeffersons
 Stephen DiRado, photographer
 Stephen C. Earle, architect
 Paul Fontaine, abstractist colorist painter
 Joslyn Fox, drag queen, contestant on Rupaul’s Drag Race season 6
 Ryan Idol, adult film actor
 Rita Johnson, actress, co-starred opposite Spencer Tracy in Edison, The Man
 Jean Louisa Kelly, actress from Yes, Dear
 Arthur Kennedy, Oscar-nominated, Tony Award-winning actor
 Dorothy Stratton King, painter and printmaker
 Diane and Elaine Klimaszewski, actresses and models best known as the "Coors Light Twins"
 Jarrett J. Krosoczka, children's book author and illustrator; his Punk Farm optioned by DreamWorks Animation
 Denis Leary, actor and comedian
 Tom Lewis, artist and activist
 Joyner Lucas, American rapper currently signed to Atlantic Records
 John Lurie, actor, musician, and composer
 Nora Marlowe (1915–1977), actress
 Eddie Mekka, actor best known for playing Carmine Ragusa on Laverne and Shirley
 Alisan Porter, former child actress and winner of Season 10 of The Voice
 Terri Priest, artist
 Sam Qualiana, actor and filmmaker involved with many low-budget horror films, including Snow Shark (2012)
 Renee Sands, former child actress and singer from Kids Incorporated and Wild Orchid
 Sam Seder, podcast host of The Majority Report, actor, writer and director
 Joseph Skinger, silversmith, sculptor
 Doug Stanhope, comedian known for abrasive style and for The Man Show
 Lewis Stone (1879–1953), actor, The Secret Six, Grand Hotel, Andy Hardy series
 Erik Per Sullivan, actor, Malcolm in the Middle
Wu Tsang, filmmaker, artist, and performer
 David Whitney, art curator
 Alicia Witt, actress, singer-songwriter
 Hildegard Woodward, children's book illustrator

Athletes

 Jerry Azumah, former NFL defensive back
Tyler Beede (born 1993), baseball pitcher for the San Francisco Giants 
 Frank Carroll, US figure skater and coach, 1960 graduate of the College of the Holy Cross, actor
 Tim Collins, relief pitcher for the Kansas City Royals
 Bob Cousy, Hall of Fame basketball player; attended the College of the Holy Cross; currently lives in Worcester
 Ken Doane, professional wrestler
 Oliver Drake, relief pitcher who's a free agent
 Rich Gedman, Boston Red Sox catcher, manager of the Worcester Tornadoes
 Bill Guerin, former Pittsburgh Penguins right winger
 Aaron Haddad, professional wrestler in WWE
 Tom Heinsohn, NBA Hall of Fame, Boston Celtics great; attended College of Holy Cross
 Gordon Lockbaum, attended Holy Cross College; twice finished in the top five in the Heisman Trophy balloting
 Dwayne McClain, former NBA/Professional basketball player. Starred at Villanova in the early/mid 1980s. Attended Holy Name Catholic Central
 Tom Poti, former NHL defenseman
 J.P. Ricciardi, MLB executive, former general manager of the Toronto Blue Jays
 José Antonio Rivera, WBA light middleweight champion
 Richard Rodgers II, 3rd-string Tight End for the Philadelphia Eagles; played for St. John's High School
 Edwin Rodríguez, boxer
 Rosy Ryan – was a professional baseball pitcher. He played ten seasons. Best remember for his time with the World Series Champion New York Giants
 Tanyon Sturtze, former MLB pitcher
 Major Taylor, track cycling champion
 Bill Toomey, gold medal decathlete, 1968 Olympics; attended Worcester Academy
 Leah Van Dale, professional wrestler better known by her ring name Carmella
 Vinnie Yablonski, NFL player

Musicians

 John Adams, popular composer
 Duncan Arsenault, musician
 Norman Bailey, big band trumpet player from The Lawrence Welk Show
 Jaki Byard, jazz pianist, composer and recording artist
 Frank Capp, jazz drummer and bandleader
 Luke Caswell, better known as Cazwell, an LGBT rapper
 Wendell Culley, jazz trumpeter from Worcester who played with Noble Sissle, Lionel Hampton, and Count Basie's Orchestra, and many others
 Don Fagerquist, jazz trumpeter
 Four Year Strong, rock band
 J. Geils, lead in J. Geils Band, attended Worcester Polytechnic Institute
 J. Geils Band, formed in Worcester as a fraternity party band at Worcester Polytechnic Institute, as Snoopy and the Sopwith Camels
 Georgia Gibbs, 1950s pop singer
 Duke Levine, guitarist
 The Hotelier, rock band
 Jordan Knight, member of the boy band New Kids On The Block
 Joyner Lucas, rapper
 Arun Luthra, jazz saxophonist, konnakol artist, composer, arranger, band leader
 Miriam "Mamie" Moffitt, jazz pianist and band leader of Mamie Moffitt and Her Five Jazz Hounds, the first professional jazz ensemble in Worcester
 Orpheus, band that enjoyed popularity in the 1960s and early 1970s
 Cole Porter, Broadway composer, student at Worcester Academy ca. 1912, born in Peru, Indiana
 Andy Ross, guitarist for rock band OK Go
 Maureen Steele, pop singer and songwriter, one of the very few white artists signed to Motown during the mid 1980s
 Einar Swan, multi-instrumental jazz musician and songwriter of "When Your Lover Has Gone"
 Boots Ward, jazz drummer, band leader, and Worcester jazz club owner

Politicians

 Charles Allen (1797–1869), United States Congressman from Massachusetts
 George Bancroft, 17th United States Secretary of the Navy, founder of the US Naval Academy at Annapolis, author of the first comprehensive history of the United States
 John Binienda, Massachusetts state legislator
 Alexander H. Bullock, Governor of Massachusetts (1866–1868)
 Kate Campanale, member of Massachusetts House of Representatives from District 17
 John Curtis Chamberlain, US Representative
 Dorothea Dix, reformer and activist
 Dwight Foster, Massachusetts Attorney General and Associate Justice of the Massachusetts Supreme Judicial Court
 Roger Sherman Baldwin Foster, lawyer 
 Emma Goldman, Lithuanian-American anarchist; owned ice cream parlor in Worcester
 Thomas Wentworth Higginson, abolitionist, literary mentor to Emily Dickinson
 Abbie Hoffman, radical activist
 Abby Kelley Foster, abolitionist, suffragette
 Jim McGovern, US Representative from Massachusetts's 2nd congressional district
 Levi Lincoln Sr., American revolutionary
 Levi Lincoln Jr., Governor of Massachusetts
 William D. Mullins, state representative and baseball player
 Albert L. Nash, politician and businessman
 Richard Neal, US Representative from Massachusetts's 1st congressional district
 Kenneth P. O'Donnell, Appointments Secretary and Political Adviser to President John F. Kennedy
 Robert Owens, businessman and Massachusetts state senator
 John Rucho, politician and businessman<ref>'1977-1978 Public Officials of the Commonwealth of Massachusetts Biographical Sketch of John Rucho, pg. 282</ref> 
 Charles F. Sullivan, Mayor of Worcester and Lieutenant Governor of Massachusetts, 1949–1953
 Benjamin Swan, longest-serving Vermont State Treasurer
 Charles G. Washburn, member of the U.S. House of Representatives

Writers and journalists

 Jane G. Austin, writer
 S. N. Behrman, playwright, author of memoir The Worcester Account Robert Benchley, writer and member of the Algonquin Round Table
 Elizabeth Bishop, poet and writer
 John D. Casey, novelist and translator 
 John Dufresne, novelist and screenwriter
 Alice Morse Earle, writer
 Esther Forbes, writer
 Samuel Fuller, screenwriter, producer and director
 John Michael Hayes, writer of the Alfred Hitchcock films Rear Window, To Catch a Thief, The Trouble with Harry, and The Man Who Knew Too Much Omar Jimenez, CNN reporter, known for being arrested on live TV while reporting on the George Floyd protests in Minneapolis
 Stanley Kunitz, Poet Laureate
 Frank O'Hara, poet
 Charles Olson, modernist poet
 Normand Poirier, writer
 Ernest Lawrence Thayer, poet and journalist, known for "Casey at the Bat"
 Isaiah Thomas, publisher of the Massachusetts Spy''
 Stanley Woodward, newspaper editor and sportswriter
 Olive Higgins Prouty, writer, known for "Now, Voyager" and "Stella Dallas"

Other

 Lillian Asplund, last survivor of the RMS Titanic who remembered the actual sinking
 William Austin Burt, 19th-century explorer and surveyor in Michigan
 Nathaniel Bar-Jonah, convicted child molester, possible serial killer and cannibal
 Timothy Bigelow, Revolutionary War patriot
 Jonas Clark, founder of Clark University
 Edgar C. Erickson (1896–1989), United States Army Major General and Chief of the National Guard Bureau
 Catherine Fiske (1784-1837), school founder
 John Stanley Grauel (1917–1986), Christian Zionist leader
 Samuel Fisk Green (1822–1884), physician and medical missionary, served with the American Ceylon Mission 1847–1873
 Samuel R. Heywood, founder of the Heywood Boot & Shoe Company
 Myra Kraft, philanthropist, wife of New England Patriots owner Bob Kraft
 Royal B. Lord (1899–1963), United States military officer
 Joe Morrone, Connecticut Huskies soccer coach
 Charley Parkhurst, stagecoach driver and horseman
 Irving Price, co-founder of Fisher Price toys and games
 George Edward Rueger (1929–2019), Roman Catholic bishop
 Stephen Salisbury III, founder of the Worcester Art Museum
 Richard B. Sellars (1915–2010), Chairman and CEO of Johnson & Johnson
 Ichabod Washburn, founder of Worcester Polytechnic Institute
 Steven N. Wickstrom, Army National Guard major general who commanded the 42nd Infantry Division
 Stillman Witt (1808–1875), Ohio railroad and steel executive, banker
 Geoffrey Zakarian, Iron Chef, Food Network Channel celebrity chef

References

	

Worcester, Massachusetts
Worcester people
List
People